Kate Diesfeld (born 1960) is a New Zealand health law academic. She is currently a full professor at the Auckland University of Technology.

Academic career
After a 1982 BA in  Sociology and Anthropology from Colgate University in New York, Diesfeld did a 1988 Juris Doctor from University of San Diego and was admitted to the State Bar of California in 1989. Between 1993 and 2000 Diesfeld worked at Kent Law School and before the Mental Health Review Tribunal in England before moving to Auckland University of Technology, then the University of Waikato in New Zealand and then back to Auckland University of Technology in 2012.

Selected works 
 Diesfeld, Kate, and Ian Freckelton. "Involuntary detention and therapeutic jurisprudence: International perspectives on civil commitment." (2003).
 Diesfeld, Kate, and Stefan Sjöström. "Interpretive flexibility: why doesn't insight incite controversy in mental health law?." Behavioral sciences & the law 25, no. 1 (2007): 85–101.
 Wareham, Pauline, Antoinette McCallin, and Kate Diesfeld. "Advance directives: the New Zealand context." Nursing ethics 12, no. 4 (2005): 349–359.
 Phillips, Michael R., Hanhui Chen, Kate Diesfeld, Bin Xie, Hui G. Cheng, Graham Mellsop, and Xiehe Liu. "China’s new mental health law: reframing involuntary treatment." American Journal of Psychiatry 170, no. 6 (2013): 588–591.
 Diesfeld, Kate, and Brian McKenna. "The unintended impact of the therapeutic intentions of the New Zealand Mental Health Review Tribunal? Therapeutic jurisprudence perspectives." Journal of law and medicine 14, no. 4 (2007): 566–574.

References

External links
 
 

1960 births
Living people
New Zealand women academics
Academics of the University of Kent
Colgate University alumni
University of San Diego alumni
Academic staff of the Auckland University of Technology
Academic staff of the University of Waikato
American lawyers
20th-century New Zealand lawyers
New Zealand women writers
21st-century New Zealand lawyers